This is a list of airports in Belarus, grouped by type and sorted by location.



Airports 

Airport names shown in bold indicate the airport has scheduled service on commercial airlines.

See also 
 Transport in Belarus
 Belarusian Air Force
 List of airports by ICAO code: U#UM - Belarus (and Kaliningrad, Russia)
 Wikipedia:WikiProject Aviation/Airline destination lists: Europe#Belarus

References 

 
 
  – includes IATA codes
  – ICAO codes and coordinates
  – IATA codes, ICAO codes and coordinates

 
Belarus
Airports
Airports
Belarus